IOG may refer to:

Institute on Governance, a Canadian think tank
Ismail Omar Guelleh, President of Djibouti
318th Information Operations Group, a unit of the US Air Force